Benjamin of Petrograd (Veniamin Petrogradsky,  – ), born Vasily Pavlovich Kazansky, was a hieromartyr, a bishop in the Russian Orthodox Church and eventually Metropolitan of Petrograd and Gdov from 1917 to 1922. He was martyred, executed by a firing squad by Soviet authorities. In April 1992 Benjamin was glorified (canonized) by the Russian Orthodox Church together with several other martyrs, including Archimandrite Sergius (Shein), Professor Yury Novitsky, and John Kovsharov (a lawyer), who were executed with him.

Background and education
Benjamin was born to a priestly family in the pogost (village) of Nimenskii in the Andreevskii volost of the Kargopolsky Uyezd near Arkhangelsk in the Olonets Governorate in the northwest of the Russian Empire.

He graduated from the Olonets Theological Seminary in 1893 and earned his candidate of theology degree from the St. Petersburg Spiritual Academy in 1897, defending a thesis on Archbishop Arcadius of Olonets' anti-heretical activities. In 1895 he was tonsured a monk and given the name Benjamin; later that year he was ordained a hierodeacon (deacon-monk) and the following year he was ordained a hieromonk (priest-monk).

Following his graduation he taught sacred scripture at the Riga Theological Seminary (1897–1898) following which he was inspector of the Kholm Theological Seminary (1898–1899) and the St. Petersburg Spiritual Academy (1899–1902). In 1902 he became rector of the Samara Theologocal Seminary and he was bestowed with the rank of archimandrite. In 1905 he became rector of the St. Petersburg Spiritual Academy.

Vicar Bishop
On  Benjamin was consecrated Bishop of Gdov, a vicar bishop of the diocese of St. Petersburg. Metropolitan Antonii (Vadkovskii) of St. Petersburg and Ladoga officiated at the installment in the Alexander Nevsky Lavra in St. Petersburg. Benjamin often served in the churches of the poorest and most remote suburbs of the capital and led the annual Easter and Christmas divine services at Putilovsky and Obukhovsky factories of St. Petersburg, and organized the charitable foundation of the Mother of God for the Care of Abandoned Women. He was known as "the indefatigable bishop."

Metropolitan of Petrograd
On  of that year, he was democratically elected by the clergy and the people to the archbishopric of Petrograd and Ladoga, the first bishop popularly elected in the Russian church. On  his title was changed to Archbishop of Petrograd and Gdov by decree of the Holy Synod, and on  he was elevated to metropolitan.

While the Church tried to maintain a neutral stance during the Russian Civil War, and Benjamin was one of the few people in Russia with no interest in politics, the Russian Orthodox Church and Soviet State had diametrically opposite world views and the church was viewed as dangerously counter-revolutionary by the Soviet authorities.  The real conflict, however, came out into the open in 1922 when the Soviet authorities demanded the church hand over church valuables to pay for famine relief.  The Russian church agreed to this, but refused to hand over certain valuables of religious or historic significance. Benjamin did not resist turning over the Church's valuables, believing it was his duty to help save lives, but insisted this be voluntary and not a plundering of church property by the Bolsheviks. On 6 March Benjamin met with a commission formed to help the starving that agreed to his voluntary dispersal of funds controlled by the parishes. Newspapers of that time praised Benjamin and his clergy for their charitable spirit. In April, Benjamin reached an agreement with Petrograd party officials to hand over certain valuables and to allow parishioners to substitute their own valuables for other church valuables of historic or religious significance. However, party leaders in Moscow did not approve of that decision and declared that the confiscation of Church property would continue. Protesters gathered in Petrograd, shouting and throwing stones at those who were stealing from the churches.

Arrest and execution

On 24 March twelve priests broke ranks with the other clergy, whom they called counter-revolutionaries and blamed for the famine, and called for unconditional surrender of all Church valuables to the Soviets. This led to outrage which Benjamin tried to calm, asking for a meeting with the authorities leading to an agreement that parishes would be permitted to keep their sacred vessels if they substituted other property of equal value.  This pacified the situation until some priests tried to wrest control of the Church from Patriarch Tikhon and the established hierarchy.  Benjamin excommunicated his priests involved with the coup which enraged the Soviets who threatened Benjamin with his and others' arrest and execution. Benjamin reacted by commencing meeting with his friends in order to say farewell and giving instructions for the administration of the diocese.

In April and May 1922, a number of churchmen were arrested and tried as counter-revolutionaries for opposing the seizure of church valuables.  Benjamin was placed under house arrest on 29 May and subsequently imprisoned after he had opposed efforts by Alexander Vvedensky to establish the renovationist All-Russian Church Administration as the new church government after Patriarch Tikhon abdicated on 12 May. Benjamin was tried by a revolutionary tribunal with ten other defendants from 10 June to 5 July. As Benjamin entered the courtroom for his trial, people stood up for him and he blessed them.  The defendants were found guilty and condemned to death, but the sentences of six of the defendants were later commuted by the Politburo, though not of Benjamin and others seen as the main instigators of counterrevolution. The defendants  were given a chance to speak, and Benjamin addressed the court saying it grieved him to be called an enemy of the people whom he had always loved and to whom he had dedicated his life.

Benjamin's cenotaph is in the Nikolskoe Cemetery of the Alexander Nevsky Lavra; the Decree of Canonization directs for Benjamin and others "That their precious remains, should they have been found, shall be considered holy relics."

See also
New Martyr
Hieromartyr
Vladimir Lossky

References

Other Literature
 "Дело" митрополита Вениамина (Петроград, 1922 г.). М., 1991
 Очерки истории Санкт-Петербургской епархии. СПб., 1994. С. 237-238
 Manuil (Lemeљevskij). "Die russischen orthodoxen Bischöfe von 1893 bis 1965": Bio-Bibliogr. Erlangen, 1981. T. 2. S. 142-145.

1873 births
1922 deaths
People from Nyandomsky District
People from Kargopolsky Uyezd
Russian saints of the Eastern Orthodox Church
Executed priests
Victims of Red Terror in Soviet Russia
20th-century Eastern Orthodox martyrs
20th-century Christian saints
20th-century Eastern Orthodox archbishops
Persecution of Eastern Orthodox Christians
Eastern Orthodox people executed by the Soviet Union
Executed people from Arkhangelsk Oblast
Executed Russian people
People executed by Russia by firing squad